The Cluster Paintings are a series of paintings created by Nabil Kanso in 1986–1988. They are characterized by compositions that divide the canvas space into sections reflecting a cluster of irregular shaped planes offering variations of contrasts and viewpoints. These characteristics expanded in later works such as the America and Living Memories series.

See also
 The Floating Shadows (triptych)

References

External links
The Cluster paintings

Modern paintings
War paintings
Series of paintings by Nabil Kanso
1980s paintings